Mohammed Lamine  (born 2 February 2000) is a Ghanaian professional footballer who plays for Portuguese club Camacha on loan from Oliveirense as a midfielder.

Club career

AS Trenčín
Lamine made his professional Fortuna Liga debut for AS Trenčín against Senica on 16 February 2019. Trenčín won the game 3:0 with Lamine playing the entire game.

Camacha
On 31 January 2023, Lamine joined Camacha on loan.

References

External links
 AS Trenčín official profile 
 Futbalnet profile 
 
 

2000 births
Living people
Ghanaian footballers
Ghana under-20 international footballers
Association football midfielders
AS Trenčín players
U.D. Oliveirense players
A.D. Camacha players
Slovak Super Liga players
Liga Portugal 2 players
Campeonato de Portugal (league) players
Ghanaian expatriate footballers
Expatriate footballers in Slovakia
Ghanaian expatriate sportspeople in Slovakia
Expatriate footballers in Portugal
Ghanaian expatriate sportspeople in Portugal